Senator Sheldon may refer to:

George L. Sheldon (1870–1960), Nebraska State Senate
Herbert Franklin Sheldon (1831–1917), Kansas State Senate
Suel A. Sheldon (1850–1926), Michigan State Senate
Tim Sheldon (born 1947), Washington State Senate

See also
Carlos D. Shelden (1840–1904), Michigan State Senate
Amanda Shelton (born 1990), Senate of Guam